This was the first edition of the tournament.

Andre Begemann and Andrea Vavassori won the title after defeating Denys Molchanov and Sergiy Stakhovsky 7–6(13–11), 4–6, [10–8] in the final.

Seeds

Draw

References

External links
 Main draw

Challenger Città di Lugano - Doubles